The Ferrari F93A was the Formula One racing car with which Scuderia Ferrari competed in the 1993 Formula One World Championship. Designed by Jean-Claude Migeot, the car carried the team's own 745 bhp V12 engine and ran on Goodyear tyres. It was driven by Frenchman Jean Alesi, in his third season with Ferrari, and Austrian veteran Gerhard Berger, who had returned to the team after three years at McLaren.

The car was not competitive, and Ferrari endured its third consecutive winless season. Alesi scored the best result with second place at the team's home race in Italy and led the opening laps in Portugal, while the team finished fourth in the Constructors' Championship with 28 points.

The F93A also sported a red and white livery, as opposed to the team's traditional all-red scheme.

Complete Formula One results
(key)

References

Ferrari Formula One cars